Silly is a municipality of Wallonia located in the province of Hainaut, Belgium. 

On January 1, 2006, Silly had a total population of 7,995.

The name of the town derives from its stream, called the Sille (French) or Zulle (Dutch), and has no relation to the English word. In the English-speaking world, it has frequently been noted on lists of unusual place names.

The municipality consists of the following districts: Fouleng, Gondregnies, Graty, Hellebecq, Hoves, Silly, Thoricourt, and Bassilly.

International relations

Twin towns – Sister cities
Silly is twinned with:
 San Miniato, Italy

References

External links 
 
 
 Local artisanal brewery

Municipalities of Hainaut (province)